Henry William Booth (1815 – 7 August 1883) was an English first-class cricketer who played for Cambridge University.

He was born in Roydon, Essex. He was a nephew of the Arctic explorer Sir Felix Booth, of the family that produced Booth's Gin. He was educated at Eton and was at Christ's College, Cambridge, for five terms from January 1835 to June 1836, though he did not take a degree. During this time he appeared in six first-class cricket matches, including one against Oxford University in 1836, and was awarded a blue. He died in Chiswick.

Notes

1815 births
1883 deaths
Cambridge University cricketers
English cricketers
People educated at Eton College
Alumni of Christ's College, Cambridge